The Miss Grillo Stakes is a Grade II American Thoroughbred horse race for two-year-olds filles over a distance of  miles on the turf track scheduled annually in late September at Belmont Park in Elmont, New York. The event currently offers a purse of $200,000.

History
The event was named for the Argentine bred filly Miss Grillo, a record breaking stakes winner in the 1940s who won the Diana Handicap twice.

The event was inaugurated on 29 October 1980 at Aqueduct Racetrack and was run over the  mile distance with Robert Kluener's Smilin' Sera winning the event by one length over De La Rose in a time of 1:51. De La Rose the following year would be crowned the US Champion Female Turf Horse.

In 1982 the event was classified as Grade III, upgraded to Grade II in 1988 and was downgraded to Grade III the following year. From 2001–2007 the race was not graded as in 2009 when the event was moved off the turf track due to the inclement weather and held over a shorter one mile distance. In 2018 the event was upgraded back to Grade II.

The event was run in two divisions in 1988.

The distance of the event has been changed several times but since 2010 the event has been run over the current distance of  miles.

The race was part of the Breeders' Cup Challenge series from 2008 to 2010, with the winner automatically qualifying for the Breeders' Cup Juvenile Fillies Turf.

In 2022 the event was moved to Aqueduct Racetrack due to infield tunnel and redevelopment work at Belmont Park.

Records
Speed  record: 
 miles:  1:40.49  – Namaste's Wish   (2007)
 miles:  1:49.53  – Belle Cherie  (1998)

Margins:
 8 lengths – Melhor Ainda  (2004)

Most wins by an owner:
 2 –  Fox Ridge Farm (1994, 2001)
 2 –  Klaravich Stables (2018, 2019)

Most wins by a jockey:
 3 – Jose Lezcano (2008, 2010, 2013)
 3 – Javier Castellano (2012, 2016, 2019)

Most wins by a trainer:
 8 –  Chad C. Brown (2008, 2012, 2013, 2014, 2016, 2017, 2018, 2019)

Winners

Legend:

 
 

Notes:

§ Ran as an entry

† In the 1990 running, Seewillo was first past the post but was disqualified for interference in the straight and Purana was declared the winner.

See also
List of American and Canadian Graded races

References

Horse races in New York (state)
Belmont Park
Flat horse races for two-year-old fillies
Turf races in the United States
Graded stakes races in the United States
Grade 2 stakes races in the United States
Recurring sporting events established in 1980
1980 establishments in New York (state)